Nathalie Demassieux (1884–1961), was a chemist and French academic who specialized in mineral chemistry. She was, after Irène Joliot-Curie and Pauline Ramart, the third woman to obtain a position as a lecturer in a French university. In tribute to her legacy with the Faculty of Sciences of Paris, the Nathalie Demassieux scientific prize was awarded for many years by the Chancellery of the Universities of Paris.

Biography 
Nathalie Filatoff was born 25 August 1884 in Savenkovo, a small village in Tula Oblast, Russia. Her parents were Wladimir Filatoff, a Russian minor nobleman, and Marine Guelariev, whose father was Polish and whose mother, Adeline Louvier de Balmont, was French. Nathalie Filatoff emigrated to France in 1901 with her brother, Vsevolod Filatoff. They studied together during the school year 1902–1903 at the École pratique des hautes études, section of philological and historical sciences.

Nathalie Filatoff continued her studies at the Sorbonne, where, she obtained: in 1909 the certificate of higher studies in mineralogy, in 1910 the certificate of higher studies in preparatory mathematics (there were 3 women out of 47 students), and in 1912 the certificate of higher studies in general physics.

She changed her name to Nathalie Demassieux after marrying a professor of chemistry Louis Demassieux on 26 August 1909. Her husband was killed on 24 August 1914 in front of Noërs during the Battle of the Frontiers, during World War I. In 1913 and 1914 her first publications appeared in the reports of the French Academy of Sciences, concerning the equilibrium between lead chloride and ammonia hydrochloride and ammonium chloride.

From 1916 to 1919, Nathalie Demassieux was an auxiliary teacher of mineral chemistry and applied chemistry certificates. After becoming a war widow, she taught chemistry at the technical school from 1919 to 1923.

Research career 

Before the First World War, Nathalie Demassieux began a thesis on the equilibrium between halogenated lead salts and alkali metals in the laboratory of Léon Ouvrard. After his death during the war, she finished her thesis under the direction of Professor Henry Louis Le Chatelier, chair of general chemistry at the Sorbonne. She became a full assistant at the Sorbonne in 1920. On 12 June 1923, she defended her doctoral thesis in physical sciences at the Faculty of Sciences of the University of Paris. The jury was composed of Georges Urbain, Jean Perrin and Victor Auger for the examiners. That same year, she became a professor of physics and chemistry at the higher primary school of the city of Paris.

In 1925, she was placed on the "aptitude list" to become a lecturer by the Advisory Committee for Higher Education, unusual for a woman. The move created a precedent as noted by the press, including the newspaper Le Figaro.

In 1928, she was a chemistry assistant at the Sorbonne when the French Academy of Sciences chose her for the Auguste Cahours prize, for which she received 3,000 francs, "awarded as an encouragement to young people who have already made themselves known by some interesting work and more particularly by research on chemistry." Her work had centered on the equilibrium between lead chloride and various other chlorides.

In 1930, Demassieux obtained a position as a lecturer at the Faculty of Sciences of the University of Caen, becoming only the third woman to obtain a position as a lecturer at a French university, after the chemists Irène Joliot-Curie (Nobel Prize winner) and Pauline Ramart (who rose to become chair of organic chemistry at the Faculty of Sciences of Paris from 1935 to her death in 1953).

Concerned with popularization and feminism, she gave lectures, such as the one on Louis Pasteur given in 1923 during the general assembly of the League for Women's Rights. She was a member of the Association for Women's Rights and of the French Association for the Advancement of Science. She was also active in Soroptimist France, an international network for the promotion of women's professional values.

Nathalie Demassieux died on 19 May 1961 in Paris and is buried there in the Père-Lachaise Cemetery.

Papers and inventions 
In 1928–1929 she collaborated with Jaroslav Heyrovský who received the Nobel Prize in Chemistry in 1959. In 1922, Heyrovsky discovered a method to analyze the occurrence and content of various substances in solutions using electrical measurements. Demassieux is first author of two papers that she published with him.

Between 1930 and 1939 she published numerous articles on the complex halogenated salts of lead, and the dehydration of double sulfates combining potassium and other chemical elements such as copper, nickel, cobalt, potassium or magnesium.

She was also interested in the development of devices, and built one apparatus allowing the study of bodies by X-rays at high temperatures (from 25° to +500° above) and another at low temperatures (from -180° to 20°). During the 1939–1945 war, she turned to practical applications by registering patents on phosphorescent pigments, on antifreeze (for fire extinguishers not freezable at -25°) and on copper de-tinning.

Students 
The first doctoral student supervised by Demassieux, Jean Kranig, defended his thesis on the oxalic and carbonic complexes of trivalent cobalt in 1929. She also directed the doctoral research of Léon Lortie, a Canadian chemist who defended his thesis on cerium in 1930. In all, she directed the research of 14 doctoral students.

Selected publications 

 Nathalie Demassieux, Étude de l’équilibre entre l’Iodure et les Iodures de Potassium et d’Ammonium – entre le Chlorure et l’Iodure de Plomb et quelques Chlorures et Iodures alcalins en solution aqueuse (Study of the equilibrium between Potassium and Ammonium Iodide and Iodide - between Lead Chloride and Iodide and some Alkali Chlorides and Iodides in aqueous solution), Ann. de Chimie, vol. 177,‎ 1923, p. 51
 Nathalie Demassieux, Action de l’acide oxalique sur quelques sels solubles de Plomb (Action of oxalic acid on some soluble lead salts), C. R. Acad. Sc., vol. 185,‎ 1927, p. 460
 Nathalie Demassieux and J. Heyrovsky, Reduction of some complex salts at the dropping mercury cathode, Vestnik IV, Pragues,‎ 1928
 Nathalie Demassieux, Action des carbonates alcalins sur le bromure, l'iodure et le nitrate de plomb, sur le Chlorure de Plomb, en solution aqueuse (Action of alkaline carbonates on lead bromide, iodide and nitrate, on lead chloride, in aqueous solution), C. R. Acad. Sc., vol. 189,‎ 1929, p. 333 et 428
 Nathalie Demassieux, Action des oxalates alcalins sur les sels halogénés de Plomb (Action of alkaline oxalates on halogenated lead salts), C. R. Acad. Sc., vol. 189,‎ 1929, p. 535
 Nathalie Demassieux and J. Heyrovsky, Etude de quelques complexes par la méthode polarographique (Study of some complexes by the polarographic method), Bull. Soc. Chimie, vol. 45-46,‎ 1929, p. 30
 Nathalie Demassieux, Contribution à l’étude du chrome trivalent (Contribution to the study of trivalent chromium), Jour. Soc. Chim. Phys., vol. 26,‎ 1929, p. 219

Nathalie Demassieux Award 
Demassieux was a dedicated researcher throughout her life, directing her doctoral students and publishing more than 30 articles and papers until her death. She became very attached to the Sorbonne laboratory where she spent many hours, so she bequeathed part of her estate to the Faculty of Sciences of Paris in 1959, and this, in turn, allowed the Chancellery of the Universities of Paris to create the Nathalie Demassieux Prize. Award recipients have included:
 1988: Brigitte Senut 
 1990: Elyès Jouini 
 1993: Anne Boutin
 1998: Cécile Murat
 2002: Itay Ben-Yaacov in 2002

References 

1884 births
1961 deaths
People from Tula Oblast
20th-century French scientists
20th-century French chemists
20th-century French women
20th-century French women scientists
University of Paris alumni
Academic staff of the University of Paris